Thomas Bellew may refer to:

 Thomas Bellew (Galway politician) (1820–1863), Irish landowner and politician
 Thomas Bellew (Louth politician) (1943–1995), Irish Fianna Fáil politician, TD for Louth Feb-Nov 1982